Ecoporanga achira is a species of beetle in the family Cerambycidae, the only species in the genus Ecoporanga.

References

Compsocerini